Liemarvin Bonevacia (born 5 April 1989) is a Dutch sprinter who was born in Willemstad, Curaçao.

Career
He was one of four people to participate in the 2012 Summer Olympics as "Independent Olympic Athletes". Bonevacia competed in the 400 m and was eliminated in the semifinals, when he injured his right hamstring and finished last.

He now represents the Netherlands. With his 44.72, achieved in the 2015 World Championships 400 m heats, Bonevacia is the current Dutch recordholder.  He competed for the Netherlands at the 2016 Olympics, in the 400 m and the 4 x 100 m.  He reached the semifinals in the 400 m.  He won bronze at the 2016 European Athletics Championship and the 2017 European Indoor Championships.

References

External links

1989 births
Living people
People from Willemstad
Curaçao male sprinters
Dutch male sprinters
Olympic male sprinters
Olympic athletes of the Netherlands
Athletes (track and field) at the 2012 Summer Olympics
Athletes (track and field) at the 2016 Summer Olympics
Athletes (track and field) at the 2020 Summer Olympics
Independent Olympic Athletes at the 2012 Summer Olympics
World Athletics Championships athletes for the Netherlands
European Athletics Championships medalists
European Athletics Indoor Championships winners
Medalists at the 2020 Summer Olympics
Olympic silver medalists in athletics (track and field)
Olympic silver medalists for the Netherlands